Shreya Narayan is an Indian film and television actress and a writer.

Early life and education

Shreya Narayan  was born in Muzaffarpur, Bihar .

Film career

In 2011, Shreya won critical acclaim for her portrayal of Mahua in the Tigmanshu Dhulia hit movie Saheb Biwi Aur Gangster.

She has acted in many Hindi movies like Knockout, Rockstar, Sukhwinder Singh's acting debut Kuch Kariye and Sudhanshu Shekhar Jha's Premmayee.

She is playing a pivotal role in Inder Kumar's Super Nani, in which the role of Nani is being portrayed by the legendary Hindi film actress Rekha. She also played the character of a mentally disturbed girl called Divya in Rajshri's Samrat & co.

She has written the lyrics of the song "Sharm Laaj" for the Soumik Sen-directed, Anubhav Sinha-produced Gulaab Gang, which was picturised on Madhuri Dixit.

She debuted in Yashraj Film's mini series called Powder, playing one of the leading characters, Julie, a high class escort and police informer. It was directed by Atul Sabharwal and played on Sony TV.

She also did another Yashraj Miniseries called Kismet, playing the character of Vasudha, an obsessive girl with a vengeful streak. It was directed by Naresh Malhotra YRF's Yeh Dillagi and played on Sony TV.

In 2015, Shreya co-produced her first film namely Wedding Anniversary. It stars Nana Patekar and Mahie Gill.
She also completed work on two films, Tigmanshu Dhulia's Yaraa opposite Amit Sadh, and Syed Afzal Ahmed's Ye Lal Rang, opposite Randeep Hooda.

In Sept 2015, her prolific portrayal of Sharmila in the story Dui Bon in Anurag Basu's Rabindranath Tagore Stories for Epic Channel was highly appreciated.

She has appeared in various ad films for brands such as Pepsodent, Vodafone, Amul, Castrol, Axis Bank, etc. Her Bharatmatrimony Kaisa Tha TVC was a hit.

She worked on the Bihar Flood Relief Mission with Prakash Jha during the Kosi river floods.

Shreya also wrote a 3 part article on the "An Economic Model of Bollywood" for the Indian Economist.

In recent years, she has done Tigmanshu Dhulia's Yaara (where she played Tanuja), and Nirang Desai's Tabeer (she played Army Major Rashmi Sharma). Yaara released in 2020 and Tabeer is yet to release.

In 2020, she was vocal about investigating Sushant Singh Rajput's death case, saying she would like to get clarity on how he died.

In March 2021, she shot for a webseries in Madhya Pradesh, tentatively titled White Gold, directed by Kittu Saluja.

Film

References

External links
 

Living people
Actresses from Madurai
Indian film actresses
Indian women comedians
Indian television actresses
Actresses in Hindi cinema
Year of birth missing (living people)
21st-century Indian actresses
People from Muzaffarpur
Indian women television presenters
Indian television presenters